"Sometimes Love Just Ain't Enough" a duet between American singers Patty Smyth and Don Henley. The rock ballad was written by Smyth and Glen Burtnik and was released as a single in August 1992. It reached  1 in Canada, where it was the most successful single of 1992, and peaked at No. 2 in Ireland and on the US Billboard Hot 100.

History
Smyth is the lead singer for the band Scandal, whose hits included "The Warrior" and "Goodbye to You"; Henley is a longtime member of the band Eagles (singing lead vocals on "Desperado" and "Hotel California", among many others) as well as a successful solo artist ("The Boys of Summer", "Dirty Laundry"). Smyth had previously provided backing vocals on Henley's solo albums Building the Perfect Beast (1984) and The End of the Innocence (1989). "Sometimes Love Just Ain't Enough" was written by Smyth and Glen Burtnik and would appear on her self-titled 1992 album.

Reception
The single was certified gold by the Recording Industry Association of America and spending six weeks at No. 2 on the US Billboard Hot 100 chart in late 1992 during the 13-week reign at No. 1 of Boyz II Men's song, "End of the Road". It remained in the top 40 for 20 weeks. The duet also topped the Billboard Adult Contemporary for four weeks. In Canada, "Sometimes Love Just Ain't Enough" spent seven weeks at No. 1 on the RPM Top Singles chart, becoming the best-performing single of 1992, while in the United Kingdom, the song reached No. 22 on the UK Singles Chart. In Ireland, the song reached number two. It was also nominated for a Grammy Award in the category Best Pop Vocal, Duo or Group.

Charts

Weekly charts

Year-end charts

Certifications

Release history

Cover versions
 Filipino diva-actress Jennylyn Mercado revived it as a carrier single of her third album Love Is (2010). Singaporean singer Stefanie Sun also covered the song for her fourth album Start (2002).
 In 2013, country singer Travis Tritt and his daughter Tyler Reese recorded a version for the re-release of Tritt's album The Storm (2007). The re-released album was titled The Calm After... and released on Tritt's own Post Oak Records on July 9, 2013. Tritt's version was released as a single in June 2013.

References

1990s ballads
1992 singles
1992 songs
2013 singles
Black-and-white music videos
Don Henley songs
Male–female vocal duets
MCA Records singles
Patty Smyth songs
Rock ballads
RPM Top Singles number-one singles
Songs written by Glen Burtnik
Travis Tritt songs